M Ross Perkins is the debut studio album by American songwriter M Ross Perkins. It was released on October 14, 2016 on SofaBurn Records on compact disc and on limited edition gold vinyl.

Track listing
All songs composed and arranged by M Ross Perkins.

 "Humboldt County Green" – 3:05
 "Project 63 Online" – 3:41
 "My Poor Daughter" – 2:07
 "Someone Else" – 3:39
 "Ever Ever Ever" – 2:56
 "Let A Little Lazy" – 2:35
 "Amazing Grace (Grandma's Dead)" – 2:17
 "Habit-Formin' Drugs" – 3:33
 "Local Showcase" – 2:55
 "No Good Sons of Galveston" – 4:00
 "Annie Waits in a Dream" – 1:13
 "Of the Gun" – 3:56

Personnel
Performance
 M Ross Perkins – all voices and instruments

Production
 Mike Montgomery – mastering engineer
 Zach Gabbard – studio assistant
 Joseph Sebaali – drum technician

Notes

2016 debut albums
M Ross Perkins albums